Piotr Orslowski (born 16 August 1974) is a Polish luger. He competed in the men's doubles event at the 1998 Winter Olympics.

References

External links
 

1974 births
Living people
Polish male lugers
Olympic lugers of Poland
Lugers at the 1998 Winter Olympics
People from Jelenia Góra